The   is a wooden pedestrian bridge over the Ōi River located in the city of Shimada, Shizuoka Prefecture, Japan.

History
The Hōrai Bridge is on the Edo period route of the Tōkaidō, connecting Edo with Kyoto. The Tokugawa shogunate expressly forbid the construction of any bridge or ferry service over the Ōi River for defensive purposes, forcing travelers to wade across its shallows. However, whenever the river flooded due to strong or long rains, crossing the river was impossible. During period of long rains, visitors were sometimes forced to stay at Shimada-juku or Kanaya-juku, sometimes for several days. Following the Meiji restoration, former samurai loyal to the Tokugawa clan settled in the Makinohara area and began to develop tea plantations. To facilitate crossing the river, this bridge was built in 1879. In 1965 its wooden pilings were replaced by concrete, but its wooden top was retained.

External links
 
 The Hourai Bridge
Shimada City home page
Shizuoka Prefecture home page

Bridges in Japan
Bridges completed in 1879
Footbridges
Toll bridges in Japan
Shimada, Shizuoka